Stuart Clifford Munday (born 28 September 1972) is an English former professional footballer who made 97 Football League appearances playing in defence for Brighton & Hove Albion.

Life and career
Munday was born in Stratford, London, and raised in Shoeburyness, Essex. He played football for Essex Schools and attended Tottenham Hotspur's School Excellence before joining Brighton & Hove Albion as a trainee in 1989. He turned professional the following year, and made his debut in February 1992. Playing mainly as a right back, he made 107 appearances in all competitions, but his 1995–96 season was disrupted by a car accident and he was released.

After leaving Brighton, Munday spent five seasons with Dover Athletic, combining semi-professional football with teacher training. He captained the team, and made 135 appearances in the Conference. He signed for Isthmian League club Kingstonian in 2001, but left after a few weeks citing work commitments. In December 2002, he joined Great Wakering Rovers, another Isthmian League club.

Munday has taught at schools including Shoeburyness High School and Palmer's College in Thurrock. He is a committed Christian.

References

1972 births
Living people
Footballers from Stratford, London
English footballers
Association football defenders
Brighton & Hove Albion F.C. players
Dover Athletic F.C. players
Kingstonian F.C. players
Great Wakering Rovers F.C. players
English Football League players
National League (English football) players
Isthmian League players